The activin A receptor also known as ACVR1C or ALK-7 is a protein that in humans is encoded by the ACVR1C gene. ACVR1C is a type I receptor for the TGFB family of signaling molecules.

ACVR1C transduces signals of Nodal. Nodal binds to ACVR2B and then forms a complex with ACVR1C. These go on to recruit the R-SMADs SMAD2 or SMAD3.

Upon ligand binding, type I receptors phosphorylate cytoplasmic SMAD family transcription factors, which then translocate to the nucleus and interact directly with DNA or in complex with other transcription factors.

References

External links

Further reading

GS domain
TS domain
S/T domain
Human proteins
EC 2.7.11